Åknes is a village in Åseral municipality in Agder county, Norway. The village sits on the north shore of the lake Lognavatnet. The Åknes Chapel was built here in 1873 to serve the northern part of the municipality.

References

Villages in Agder
Åseral